La Cinco y Diez (lit. "The Five and Ten", also written "La 5 y 10"), is the name of an intersection, pedestrian overpass over that intersection, public transportation hub and major retail district in La Mesa borough, Tijuana, Mexico. The name exists because a branch of the Luján/Cardenas family's "La Cinco y Diez" five and dime store once stood here, and Tijuana residents taking taxis or buses would ask to be let off by "La Cinco y Diez".

The area has numerous shopping centers, department stores, supermarkets and hypermarkets, including:
Plaza Carrousel, with a Cinépolis multicinema, Soriana Súper supermarket, and a Sears department store
 Plaza Cedros with an Elektra appliance/electronics/motorcycle store
 Plaza 5 y 10 with a Ley supermarket and Coppel department store
 Plaza Díaz Ordaz with a Calimax supermarket
 Plaza Las Brisas with an additional Coppel department store, "Soriana híper" hypermarket, and an additional Elektra appliance/electronics/motorcycle store
 Serviplaza Mesa 5 y 10 with Coppel and FAMSA department stores and a "Soriana Híper" hypermarket 
 Swap Meet 5 y 10
 Swap Meet Las Carpas
 a free-standing Smart & Final supermarket
 a free-standing La Parisina department store 
 a Caliente casino

References

Neighborhoods in Tijuana
Shopping malls in Tijuana
Edge cities in Mexico
Shopping districts and streets in Mexico